Soulstone can refer to the following:

 Soulstone, an object used to store an Eldar's soul in the Warhammer 40,000 universe.
 Soul Stone, a jewel or stone used to trap and contain a demon's soul in the Diablo universe.
 Soulstone, an item in the World of Warcraft universe that is created by the warlock class, which allows the character whom it is cast upon to bring themselves back to life.
 Soulstone, an object in Dungeons and Dragons Online used to bring someone back to life.
 Soulstone, a type of stone or gem used to trap and contain the souls of creatures in the Elder Scrolls Game Series